Launched in April 2010, World of Sports was a weekly sports show airing on Dubai One and featuring a mixture of local and international sports highlights, studio and telephone interviews with sporting personalities and a variety of sports related features. Series One was hosted by Layne Redman with Tom Urquhart, Mark Pendergast, Noel Miller and Anas Bukhash appearing as regular studio guests. Series two saw a change in host with Tom Urquhart taking the hosting duties and a change in focus from the international sports of Season One to cover more local sporting events. The show was broadcast on Dubai One in the UAE at Dubai Media Incorporated's Maktoum Studios and could be viewed all over the middle east and Africa. Each episode debuted on Thursday nights at 20:00 UAE time (19:00 KSA) and was thirty minutes in duration.

Presenters

Filming

The show was filmed at Studio F at DMI's Maktoum studios in Dubai in the United Arab Emirates.

Dubai One original programming
2011 Emirati television series debuts
2010s Emirati television series